Armand G. Sansoucy (January 7, 1910 - August 28, 1983) was an American politician (a Democrat) who held several positions including State Auditor for the State of Maine (1965-1969) and mayor of Lewiston, Maine (1949-1950).

References

Maine Democrats
Mayors of Lewiston, Maine
Maine State Auditors
1910 births
1983 deaths